"Better Than You Left Me" is the debut single from American country music artist Mickey Guyton.  It was released to country radio on January 12, 2015 as the first single from her self-titled second EP (2015) and forthcoming debut studio album for Capitol Nashville. The song was written by Guyton, Jennifer Hanson, Jenn Schott, and Nathan Chapman. A re-recorded version of the song is included on Guyton's 2021 debut album Remember Her Name.

Content
Guyton said that the single was inspired by a breakup with a former boyfriend who "came running back to" her after she got the opportunity to sing for the President of the United States. In the song, the female narrator encounters a former lover, and tells him that she is "better than you left me".

Critical reception
Taste of Country named the song a "Critic's Pick" from editor Billy Dukes, who called Guyton a "pure country vocalist who relies on talent and strong songwriting before anything else". USA Todays Brian Mansfield also reviewed the single favorably, saying that it "has a soaring melody that reflects its strength of spirit."

Music video
Peter Zavadil directed the music video, which premiered January 12, 2015 on CMT.

Chart performance
The song has sold 145,000 copies in the US as of May 2015.

Year-end charts

References

2015 songs
2015 debut singles
Capitol Records Nashville singles
Songs written by Jennifer Hanson
Songs written by Nathan Chapman (record producer)
Mickey Guyton songs
Song recordings produced by Nathan Chapman (record producer)
Song recordings produced by Dann Huff
Songs written by Mickey Guyton
Music videos directed by Peter Zavadil